Shílǐtíng (十里亭) may refer to:

 Shiliting, Shaoguan, town in Zhenjiang District, Shaoguan, Guangdong, China
 Shiliting, Shahe, town in Hebei, China